La Vérité was the last album by Niagara. Niagara was one of the few French bands who had success and critical acclaim outside France despite not singing in English, because of this they embarked on an international tour in 1991 which included many sold out concerts. Based on this success, Polydor decided to spare no expense on La Vérité which was recorded with a big band consisting of 45 musicians and had a special jewel case with a relief of the logo of the band on the cover.

The album was dark with an apocalyptic sound, sometimes bordering on hard rock with ballads intermixed and deals with subjects like the state of the planet, the weird role of the media, the problems of being accepted and being a woman. Up to now they were known for an acid rock sound which was reasonably happy. The change of theme resulted in an album which didn't go straight to #1 like their previous two albums, . The album was nevertheless certified Gold. On the personal side, the relationship between Muriel Moreno, the flamboyant singer, and Daniel Chenevez, the guitar and keyboard player, was not as it used to be. Niagara gave a final concert in Le Zénith, Paris on 25 March 1992 before going their separate ways with moderately successful solo careers.NB. Sound quality: DDD.

Track listing

Album credits

Personnel

Muriel Moreno - lead vocals, backing vocals, guitar
Daniel Chenevez - keyboards, Hammond organ, piano, programming
Andy Newmark - drums
Evert Verhees - bass guitar
René Van Barneveld - guitar
Yarol Poupaud - guitar
P.P. Arnold - backing vocals
Juliet Roberts - backing vocals
Christian Le Chevretel - trumpet
Patrick Mortier - trumpet
Michel Marin - saxophone
Carlo Mertens - trombone
Wim Poesen - bagpipe
Jean-Pierre Vanttees - bagpipe
Patrick Moreau - tuba
Karel Van Wynandaele - tuba
Jacques Blanche - French horn
Michel Leveugle - French horn
Dirk de Caluwé - flute
Werner Braïto - harmonica
Frank Michiels - percussion
Arnoult Massart - string conducting

String section 1
Jean-Pierre Catoul - violin
Éric Gerstmans - violin
Christian Gerstmans - viola
Jean-Paul Zanutel - cello
André Klenes - double bass

String section 2
Manuel Cormacho - violin
Shahrzad Djanati - violin
Christian Gerstmans - violin
André Klenes - violin
Hélène Lislu - violin
Ariane Plumerel - violin
Georges Siblik - violin
Ulysse Waterlot - violin
Patrick Dussart - viola
Éric Gerstmans - viola
Sylvia Tolis - viola
Jean-Paul Dessy - cello
Fernando Lage - cello
Sigrid Vandenbogaerde - cello
Gerry Cambier - double bass
Alain Denis - double bass

Production
Arranged & produced by Daniel Chenevez
Engineered by Erwin Autrique
Mixed by Dominique Blanc-Francard at Electric Lady Studios, New York City
Mastered by Bob Ludwig at Masterdisk, New York City
Executive producer - Cyril Prieur

Design
Jean-Baptiste Mondino - black and white photography
Eddie Monsoon - colour photography
Juergen Teller - front cover & back cover photography
Den Denis - paintbox
Niagara - cover design

References

1992 albums
Niagara (band) albums
Polydor Records albums